The Sontaran Games is a BBC Books original novella written by Jacqueline Rayner and based on the long-running British science fiction television series Doctor Who. It features the Tenth Doctor as played by David Tennant. This paperback is part of the Quick Reads Initiative sponsored by the UK government, to encourage literacy. It has a similar look to BBC Books' other new series adventures, except for its much shorter word count, being a paperback and not being numbered as part of the same series. To date it is the one of only five novels based upon the revived series that have not been published in hardcover.

References

External links

The Cloister Library - The Sontaran Games

2009 British novels
2009 science fiction novels
Doctor Who novellas
Tenth Doctor novels
Novels by Jacqueline Rayner
British science fiction novels